Dartfish is a company based in Fribourg, Switzerland. The company develops online and offline video software to enable users to view, edit and analyze videos for individual and corporate use. The company was founded in 1999 at the Swiss Institute of Technology EPFL and has offices in Atlanta, Georgia, USA; Sophia Antipolis, France; Sydney, Australia; Tokyo, Japan; and Seoul, Korea.

History 
Dartfish was founded in 1999 as InMotion Technologies, Ltd to commercially develop SimulCamTM and other digital imaging applications. SimulCamTM technology was followed by StroMotionTM, in January 2001.

In January 2004, Dartfish entered a distribution agreement with South America in Chile. Five months later, Dartfish launched its third version (3.0) of the Dartfish software. In November 2004, Dartfish created a new subsidiary in France to distribute its software.  In June 2005, Dartfish launched version 4.0 of the software.

Technical Details 
Dartfish.TV is an integrated solution across multiple platforms (software, online, mobile) that allows users to capture videos, tag events real-time, and upload, organize and share the videos via Dartfish TV channel. Tagging enables users to bookmark specific events or series of events in their videos so that users including coaches, athletes and corporate managers can identify specific stats or important moments in the video and directly navigate or share the moments.
Dartfish Software is used by athletic coaches to break down and analyze the movements as well as categorize videos to create an index of events (e.g. pass goal, player, etc.). The software uses digital video graphics to deliver instant visual feedback.
Also, it is reported that it can improve processes and performance, trainings, risk management and HR functions.

Use
Dartfish software supported the athletes who won 400 medals during the Olympic Games in 2012 and helped to prepare the U.S. team in the 2011 Davis Cup. Its network of users includes major league sports teams, Olympic committees from many nations, federations, colleges and universities, high schools, prep schools, branches of military, industry and professionals, as well as athletes and students of all levels in numerous academic fields.

Recognition 
2006 winner of the Korean Culture and Sports Ministry competition for identifying innovative, high-value added sports service business with its proposal, Customized Online Prescription of Physiotherapy 

2005 Emmy winner for The George Wensel Outstanding Innovative Technical Achievement Award 

1999 European IST Prize Winner (InMotion)

References 

Software companies of Switzerland
Video software